Groove is the fourth studio album by Australian Indie pop, rock band Eurogliders, released in March 1988.

In early 1987, three long-term members, John Bennetts, Ron Francois and Amanda Vincent, left the band.  Reduced to a duo, Bernie Lynch and Grace Knight recorded their fourth album (Groove) with session musicians, including long-time Eurogliders guitarist Crispin Akerman.  Despite Akerman's presence on the album it was clear that Lynch and Knight by themselves were now the Eurogliders, as they were the only people pictured on the album cover or inner sleeve, or on any of the album's associated singles.

Groove peaked at No. 25 on the Australian charts in April 1988. The related single, "Groove" had peaked at No. 13 in February but the next singles, "It Must Be Love" in May, "Listen" in September and "Precious" in March 1989 did not reach the top 50.

For the album tour, Lynch, Knight and Akerman were joined by Guy Le Claire on guitar, Rex Goh on guitar (ex-Air Supply), Lindsay Jehan on bass guitar and Steve Sowerby on drums.  Later in 1989, the Eurogliders disbanded.

Track listing

Charts

Personnel
Eurogliders
 Grace Knight — vocals, keyboards
 Bernie Lynch — vocals, guitar, keyboards

Additional musicians
 Crispin Akerman — guitar
 Ian Belton — bass guitar
 Peter Bondy — bass synth on "Listen"
 Craig Calhoun — bass guitar
 Andy Cichon — bass guitar
 Stuart Fraser — guitar
 Jacky — vocals
 Joy Smithers — backing vocals
 The Sween — drums, drum programming
 Steve Sowerby — percussion
 Phil Whitcher — keyboards, Hammond organ

References

1988 albums
Eurogliders albums
Columbia Records albums